Public Ledger may refer to:

The Public Ledger, an agricultural commodities journal first published in 1760 and still published today.
Public Ledger (Philadelphia), a daily newspaper in Philadelphia, Pennsylvania, published from 1836 to 1942.
Public Ledger (Memphis, Tenn.), a daily newspaper in Memphis, Tennessee, published from 1865 to 1893. 
Blockchain (database) - a cryptographic implementation of a public ledger